Lorraine McKenna ( Giroux; born December 22, 1968) is an American folk, Americana, and country music singer-songwriter. In 2016, she was nominated for the Grammy Award for Song of the Year and won Best Country Song for co-writing the hit single "Girl Crush" performed by Little Big Town. In 2017, she again won Best Country Song at the 59th Annual Grammy Awards for writing "Humble and Kind" performed by Tim McGraw. 
McKenna along with Lady Gaga, Natalie Hemby and Hillary Lindsey wrote the second single off the soundtrack to the 2018 film A Star Is Born called "Always Remember Us This Way.” McKenna performed backing vocals along with Lindsey and Hemby, and the song received a nomination for Song of the Year at the 62nd Annual Grammy Awards.

Early and personal life
McKenna was born and raised in Stoughton, Massachusetts, where she still lives today. Her mother died when she was seven years old, a theme often touched on in her music. She met her husband, Gene McKenna, in third grade and married him at age 19. She has five children and has been married for more than 30 years.

McKenna first started writing lullabies to her children. Her brother, who first introduced her to the guitar, encouraged her to attend an open-mic night at the Old Vienna Kaffeehause in Westborough, Massachusetts in 1996. The organizer heard her play and encouraged her to come back, becoming her informal manager and booking shows for her around Boston.

Career
McKenna was managed by Gabriel Unger from 2000 to 2004. During this time, she released her first four albums under Signature Sounds and developed a folk music fan base in the Northeast. She won awards at the Boston Music Awards, and performed at the Sundance Film Festival.

In 2004, singer-songwriter Mary Gauthier introduced McKenna's album Bittertown to her Nashville friends. Upon hearing it, Faith Hill stalled her completed 2005 record Fireflies to replace tracks with covers of McKenna's songs. Hill and husband Tim McGraw became McKenna's champions and asked her to tour with them in 2006. Hill took McKenna to perform with her on the Oprah Winfrey Show. McGraw helped bring McKenna to Warner Bros. Nashville in 2007 and produced her album Unglamorous. Following the lackluster sales, she parted ways with Warner Bros. She then signed with Universal Music Group Publishing in 2009 and independently released her next album Lorraine in 2011.

Since then, McKenna has become "one of the industry’s most in-demand songwriters." She has written songs for artists including Sara Evans, Reba McEntire, Tim McGraw, Carrie Underwood, and Keith Urban. She wrote 10 songs that made it to the Billboard Hot Country list, including Hunter Hayes' "I Want Crazy", Faith Hill's "Stealing Kisses", Tim McGraw's "Humble and Kind"; and Little Big Town's "Your Side of the Bed", "Sober", and "Girl Crush."

McKenna writes solo and co-writes with songwriters Hillary Lindsay and Liz Rose. The group wrote the song "Girl Crush", and it became a hit for the band Little Big Town. The song received Grammy nominations for both Song of the Year and Best Country Song, winning the latter in 2016. The song was nominated for Song of the Year Song at the Academy of Country Music Awards, and won Song of the Year at the Country Music Association Awards.

McKenna won another Grammy the next year for Best Country Song for "Humble and Kind" by Tim McGraw. McKenna wrote the song as "lullaby, guidebook, and tribute" to her five children. The song was named Song of the Year at the 2016 CMA Awards and won favorite country song at the American Music Awards the same year. In 2017, "Humble and Kind" was nominated for Song of the Year and Single Record of the Year at the ACM Awards. McKenna was named Songwriter of the Year at the ACM's that same year.

McKenna has received critical acclaim for her album The Bird and the Rifle. The album was produced by Dave Cobb and nominated for Best Americana Album at the 59th annual Grammy Awards, and the single "Wreck You" was nominated for Best American Roots Song and Best American Roots Performance. McKenna was nominated for the 2017 Americana Music Awards Artist of the Year. Her 10th studio album, The Tree, was produced by Dave Cobb and released in summer 2018 through Thirty Tiger Records.

In 2015, McKenna was signed to a management and publishing deal with Creative Nation, a Nashville-based company owned and operated by songwriter Luke Laird and his wife Beth. On September 25, 2018, McKenna signed a publishing deal with Creative Nation for a three-year deal.

In 2020, McKenna released her eleventh album, The Balladeer, through CN Records and Thirty Tigers. Music critic Robert Christgau hailed it as "the most consistently top-notch album of her late-blooming career".

In 2020, McKenna co-wrote "A Beautiful Noise" with 7 other female writers - Alicia Keys, Brandi Carlile, Brandy Clark, Hillary Lindsey, Ruby Amanfu, Hailey Whitters and Linda Perry - and the song was performed by Alicia Keys and Brandi Carlile with the purpose of inspiring American voters to vote in the 2020 Presidential Election.

In 2021, singer-songwriter Taylor Swift released her second re-recorded album Red (Taylor's Version), including a song called "I Bet You Think About Me" featuring Chris Stapleton. The song was written by Swift and McKenna in 2011.

Discography

Studio albums

Songwriting

Awards and nominations

References

External links
Official website
 
Lori McKenna: An 'Unglamorous' Star Is Born : NPR Music
Lori McKenna Live in Studio from WGBH Radio Boston

1968 births
Living people
American women country singers
Singer-songwriters from Massachusetts
American folk guitarists
American folk singers
American country singer-songwriters
Grammy Award winners
Warner Records artists
People from Stoughton, Massachusetts
Guitarists from Massachusetts
20th-century American guitarists
21st-century American women singers
20th-century American women singers
Signature Sounds artists
20th-century American singers
21st-century American singers
20th-century American women guitarists
Thirty Tigers artists